Ahmad Reza Talebian (born 19 May 1989 in Isfahan) is an Iranian canoeist. He competed in the men's K-1 1000 metres event at the 2012 Summer Olympics.

He won a gold medal at the Canoeing at the 2010 Asian Games He won a bronze medal at the Canoeing at the 2018 Asian Games and gold medal in the 2013 Asian Canoe Sprint Championships and Participate in the London Olympics Canoeing at the 2012 Summer Olympics – Men's K-1 1000 metres.

References 

 احمدرضا طالبیان قهرمان طلایی قایقرانی iribnews.ir (in Persian). 21 July 2018
 طالبیان و مجللی طلا گرفتن varzesh3.com (in Persian).
 احمدرضا طالبیان به ایران بازگشت _ایسنا www.isna.ir (in Persian). 12 April 2016
 احمدرضا طالبیان کسی سهمیه سهمیه المپیک امسال بسیار سخت هست www.irasin.ir (in Persian). 15 January 2020
 همیشه دنبال بهترین عملکرد و نتیجه در قایقرانی هستم/ توانایی شگفتی سازی در قایق تیمی داریم icf.ir (in Persian). 15 April 2019

External links
Ahamdreza Talebian at the International Olympic Committee
 
Ahmadreza Talebian on Instagram

Living people
1989 births
Iranian male canoeists
Asian Games gold medalists for Iran
Asian Games silver medalists for Iran
Asian Games bronze medalists for Iran
Olympic canoeists of Iran
Canoeists at the 2012 Summer Olympics
Asian Games medalists in canoeing
Canoeists at the 2010 Asian Games
Canoeists at the 2014 Asian Games
Canoeists at the 2018 Asian Games
Medalists at the 2010 Asian Games
Medalists at the 2014 Asian Games
Medalists at the 2018 Asian Games
21st-century Iranian people